John T. Smithee (born September 7, 1951) is an American politician and attorney serving as a member of the Texas House of Representatives from the 86th district. Elected in November 1984, he assumed office in January 1985.

Education 
Smithee earned a Bachelor of Business Administration from West Texas A&M University and a Juris Doctor from the Texas Tech University School of Law.

Career 
After graduating from law school, Smithee has worked as a businessman and attorney. He was elected to the Texas House of Representatives in November 1984 and assumed office in January 2015. During the 2017 legislative session, Smithee served as chair of the Judiciary and Civil Jurisprudence Committee.

References

External links
 State legislative page

Living people
1951 births
Texas Tech University School of Law alumni
Republican Party members of the Texas House of Representatives
People from Amarillo, Texas
Texas lawyers
West Texas A&M University alumni